Lement Upham "Lem" Harris (March 1, 1904 – 21 September 2002) was a member of the American Communist Party.

Biography
Lement U. Harris, known to his friends as "Lem,"  was the son of John Francis Harris (c. 1875–1941), the founder of the Wall Street brokerage firm of Harris, Winthrop, and Company. He graduated from Harvard University in 1926.

Harris went to work on a farm in Pennsylvania for three years. He was invited to Russia by Harold Ware, one of the American Communist Party's leading agricultural experts. He returned to the United States convinced that the Soviet system was superior to the West. Once back in the United States he conducted a nine-month survey of life in rural agricultural America. They published their results in The American Farmer. Harris then joined the Communist Party, and remained a member until his death on September 21, 2002.

Lem Harris' papers reside at the University of Iowa in Iowa City.

Footnotes

External links
 "Papers of Lement Harris Manuscript Register," University of Iowa, Iowa City, IA.

1904 births
2002 deaths
Harvard University alumni
American Marxists
American communists
Members of the Communist Party USA